Matesi (Greek: Μάτεσι) is a small mountain village in the municipal unit of Andritsaina, Elis, Greece. According to the 2011 census, its population was 109. It is located on a hill above the left bank of the river Alfeios. It is 3 km northwest of Theisoa, 6 km east of Alifeira and 6 km northeast of Andritsaina.

Population 

Matesi is the birthplace of George and Theodora Drelles (ne Dreliozis, née Trapalis).  They eventually settled in Muskegon, Michigan after arriving in the US in 1912. They raised a family of nine children, and were successful in the restaurant business.  Five sons served in the US Army in World War II.  The second son, Peter, received a Bronze Star.

See also 

List of settlements in Elis

External links 
 Matesi GTP Travel Pages

References

Andritsaina
Populated places in Elis